Tiszaszentmárton is a village in Szabolcs-Szatmár-Bereg county, in the Northern Great Plain region of eastern Hungary. The settlement can be reached by road: on road 4 to Tuzsér, then to the left to Tiszabezdéd, from Záhony.

Geography

History 
Founded in 1067.
The Gothic church from the 14th century in the place of early Roman St. Martin chapel.

The very early, XI. It got its name from the chapel built in honor of St. Martin in the 16th century.

Its name is first mentioned in the charters in 1212, as the Land of Artolph, but also as St. Martin.

Its first known owner was Artolph of the genus Aba.

In 1322 it was the property of the members of the Tomaj clan.

In 1584 the settlement belonged to the family of Losonczi and Anna of Losonczi.

He was married to the Forgácz family in 1588, and Zsigmond Forgácz received it from Anna Losonczi.

The Losonczy family dates back to the 16th century. In the 16th century he built a castle here, which was owned by the king and the princes of Transylvania. The estate was built in the XVII. It was acquired by the Forgách family in the 18th century. It was owned by several other families in the 16th century and remained theirs until 1945. The building has now been completely destroyed, most of it washed away by the Tisza; traces of it on the Lake line are barely visible. Its place was declared protected in 1964.

The Tisza Bridge on the Tiszaszentmárton – Salókai railway was built in the administrative territory of Tiszaszentmárton in 1964, which created a second connection with the Soviet Union by rail near Záhony. To this day, this is the main direction of freight traffic.

Economy

References

Populated places in Szabolcs-Szatmár-Bereg County